Lilium philadelphicum, also known as the wood lily, Philadelphia lily, prairie lily, or western red lily, is a perennial species of lily native to North America.

Distribution
The plant is widely distributed in much of Canada from British Columbia to Quebec, and parts of the United States (Northeast and Great Lakes regions plus the Rocky and Appalachian Mountains).

Description
Lilium philadelphicum grows to a height of approximately 30 to 90 centimeters. It produces red or orange blooms between June and August.

Varieties
Lilium philadelphicum var. andinum—western wood lily, native to Midwestern U.S., Great Plains, and Western U.S. regions. It is the floral emblem of the province of Saskatchewan in Canada, and is on the flag of Saskatchewan.

Conservation
Lilium philadelphicum is listed as an endangered species in Maryland, New Mexico, Tennessee and North Carolina. Its status is a threatened species in Kentucky and Ohio.

As the Saskatchewan provincial floral emblem, it is protected under the Provincial Emblems and Honours Act, and cannot be picked, uprooted or destroyed in any manner.

Toxicity
Cats are extremely sensitive to lily toxicity and ingestion is often fatal. Households and gardens that are visited by cats are strongly advised against keeping this plant or placing dried flowers where a cat may brush against them and become dusted with pollen that they then consume while cleaning. Suspected cases require urgent veterinary attention.

Rapid treatment with activated charcoal and/or induced vomiting can reduce the amount of toxin absorbed (this is time-sensitive so in some cases, vets may advise doing it at home), and large amounts of fluid by IV can reduce damage to kidneys to increase the chances of survival.

Traditional uses
The bulbs were eaten by some Native Americans.

Gallery

References

External links
  University of Michigan at Dearborn: Native American Ethnobotany of Lilium philadelphicum

philadelphicum
Flora of Canada
Flora of Western Canada
Flora of the Northeastern United States
Flora of the North-Central United States
Flora of the South-Central United States
Flora of Alabama
Flora of Arkansas
Flora of Colorado
Flora of Delaware
Flora of Georgia (U.S. state)
Flora of Kentucky
Flora of Maryland
Flora of North Carolina
Flora of Ontario
Flora of Quebec
Flora of South Carolina
Flora of Tennessee
Flora of Virginia
Flora of Washington, D.C.
Flora of Wyoming
Flora of the United States
Flora of the Appalachian Mountains
Flora of the Great Lakes region (North America)
Flora of the Rocky Mountains
Plants used in traditional Native American medicine
Plants described in 1762
Taxa named by Carl Linnaeus
Endangered flora of the United States
Provincial symbols of Saskatchewan
Flora without expected TNC conservation status